Mock Morris is a musical work by Percy Grainger.
Grainger wrote versions for string orchestra and solo piano. Composed in 1910, the work was first played at a concert in the Queen's Hall in 1912.

References

External links
 
 Recording by Grainger

1910 compositions
Compositions by Percy Grainger